Saint Paul's Church Mela Ilandaikulam (Tamil: தூய பவுல் தேவாலயம்) in Tirunelveli District, Tamil Nadu, is located in Mela Ilandaikulam, India.

History
St. Paul Church Mela Ilandaikulam Tirunelveli diocese (marai mavattam), launched on 28 December 1903. If the Christian people of this village after 2005 started work in the church tower. But church tower the opening ceremony of was observed on 20 May 2007. This church operates under the Manur and Erandum Sollan church councils.

Festival and specialities
Every year on 20 May, a seven-day festival takes place. The first day is for prayer and worship. The second day a gospel meeting follows; school children's art shows play an important role. Festivities take place at night. Many people return to the village during the festival.

Campanile
Its interior is includes the giant campanile. The bell is sounded when a fire breaks out and for marriages and funeral.

References

Churches in Tirunelveli district
Churches completed in 1903
Church of South India church buildings in India
1903 establishments in India